The Maurice River Township School District is a community public school district that serves students in pre-kindergarten through eighth grade, from Maurice River Township, in Cumberland County, New Jersey, United States.

As of the 2018–19 school year, the district, comprised of one school, had an enrollment of 406 students and 34.0 classroom teachers (on an FTE basis), for a student–teacher ratio of 11.9:1.

The district is classified by the New Jersey Department of Education as being in District Factor Group "B", the second-lowest of eight groupings. District Factor Groups organize districts statewide to allow comparison by common socioeconomic characteristics of the local districts. From lowest socioeconomic status to highest, the categories are A, B, CD, DE, FG, GH, I and J.

The district sens 180 students in ninth through twelfth grades for public school to attend high school in Millville together with students from Commercial Township, Lawrence Township and Woodbine, as part of a sending/receiving relationship with the Millville Public Schools. Students attend
Memorial High School for grades 9 and half of 10th with 701 students and 
Millville Senior High School for grades 10-12 with 1,107 students.

Awards and recognition
Maurice River Township School was recognized by Governor Jim McGreevey in 2003 as one of 25 schools selected statewide for the First Annual Governor's School of Excellence award.

School
Maurice River Township School had an enrollment of 403 students in grades PreK-8 in the 2018–19 school year.

Administration
Core members of the district's administration are:
Dr. Jeremy Cohen, Superintendent
Patricia Powell, Business Administrator / Board Secretary

Board of education
The district's board of education, comprised of seven members, sets policy and oversees the fiscal and educational operation of the district through its administration. As a Type II school district, the board's trustees are elected directly by voters to serve three-year terms of office on a staggered basis, with either two or three seats up for election each year held (since 2012) as part of the November general election. The board appoints a superintendent to oversee the day-to-day operation of the district.

References

External links
Maurice River Township School
 
School Data for the Commercial Township School District, National Center for Education Statistics

Maurice River Township, New Jersey
New Jersey District Factor Group B
School districts in Cumberland County, New Jersey